Kova Laxmi (born 5 February 1973) is an Indian politician and a legislator of Telangana Legislative Assembly. She won as MLA from Asifabad on Telangana Rashtra Samithi. She was elected as Kumram Bheem Asifabad district Zilla Parishad Chairperson in 2019.

Early life
She was born in Asifabad, Telangana. She completed her Secondary School Certificate in Asifabad.

Career
She won as MLA in 2014 from Asifabad assembly constituency.

Personal life
She is married to Kova Sone Rao.

References

People from Telangana
Living people
People from Adilabad
Telangana Rashtra Samithi politicians
Telangana MLAs 2014–2018
1973 births